Andrea Doria, Prince of Melfi (30 November 146625 November 1560) was a Genoese statesman, and admiral, who played a key role in the Republic of Genoa during his lifetime.

As the ruler of Genoa, Doria reformed the Republic's constitution. Originally elected for life, the Doge's office was reduced to two years. At the same time plebeians were declared ineligible, and the appointment of the doge was entrusted to the members of the great and the little councils. His reformed constitution of the Republic of Genoa would last until the end of the republic in 1797.

From 1528 until his death, Doria exercised a predominant influence in the councils of the Genoese republic. He is also considered the foremost naval leader of his time.

Several ships were named in honour of the admiral, the most famous being the Italian passenger liner , launched in 1951, which sank following a collision in 1956.

Early life

Doria was born at Oneglia from the ancient Genoese family the Doria di Oneglia, a branch of the noble Doria family, who played a major role in the history of the Republic since the 12th century. His parents were related: Ceva Doria, co-lord of Oneglia, and Caracosa Doria, of the Doria di Dolceacqua branch.  Orphaned at an early age, he became a soldier of fortune, serving first in the papal guard and then under various Italian princes.

As admiral 
In 1503, he fought in Corsica in the service of the Genoese Navy, at that time under French vassalage, and took part in the rising of Genoa against the French, whom he compelled to evacuate the city. From that time onwards, he became famous as a naval commander. For several years he scoured the Mediterranean in command of the Genoese fleet, waging war on the Turks and the Barbary pirates and defeating them at Pianosa.

In the meanwhile Genoa had been recaptured by the French, and in 1522 by the armies of the Spanish Empire.
But Doria joined the French or popular faction and entered the service of King Francis I of France, who made him captain-general; in 1524 he relieved Marseille, which was besieged by the Imperials, and later helped to place his native city once more under French domination. His ships, under the command of his nephew, Filippino Doria, crushed a Spanish squadron on 28 April 1528 at the Battle of Capo d'Orso.

Dissatisfied with his treatment at the hands of Francis, who was mean about payment, he resented the king's behavior in connection with Savona, which he delayed handing back to the Genoese as he had promised.  Consequently, on the expiration of Doria's contract he entered the service of Emperor Charles V (June 1528).

As imperial admiral, he commanded several expeditions against the Ottoman Empire between 1530 and 1541.  He captured Koroni and Patras, and co-operated with the emperor himself in the capture of Tunis (1535). Charles found him an invaluable ally in the wars with Francis I, and through him extended his domination over the whole of Italy.

In February 1538, Pope Paul III succeeded in assembling a Holy League (comprising the Papal States, Spain, the Holy Roman Empire, the Republic of Venice, and the Maltese Knights) against the Ottomans, but Hayreddin Barbarossa defeated its combined fleet, commanded by Andrea Doria, at the Battle of Preveza in September 1538. This victory secured Turkish dominance over the eastern Mediterranean for the next 33 years, until the Battle of Lepanto in 1571.

Doria accompanied Charles V on the ill-fated Algiers expedition of 1541, of which he disapproved, and which ended in disaster. For the next five years he continued to serve the emperor in various wars, in which he was generally successful and always active, although now over seventy years old.

Ruling the Genoese Republic

In September 1528 Andrea Doria and his forces drove the French out of Genoa and were triumphantly received by the city.

Doria reformed the constitution in an aristocratic sense, eliminating the factions that had plagued the republic in the past centuries, and constituted a new oligarchic form of government composed of the city’s principal aristocratic families, creating 28 Alberghi or "clans". The 28 Alberghi that formed this new ruling class included the Cybo, Doria, Fieschi, Giustiniani, Grimaldi, Imperiale, Pallavicino, and Spinola families.

He refused offers to take the lordship of Genoa and even the dogeship, but accepted the position of "perpetual censor", and exercised predominant influence in the councils of the republic until his death. The title "censor" in this context was modeled on its meaning in the Roman Republic, i.e., a highly respected senior public official (see Roman censor), rather than its modern meaning having to do with censorship.

To protect the restored republic from future foreign attacks, Andrea Doria sponsored the construction of a new city wall, which was built in the third decade of the sixteenth century, on a design by the military engineer Giovanni Maria Olgiati. This new city wall actually followed the path of the previous 14th century walls, but replaced the old square-plan towers and walls with new curtain-shaped curtain walls and triangular bastions.

Later years

After the Peace of Crépy between Francis and Charles in 1544, Doria hoped to end his days in quiet. However, his great wealth and power, as well as the arrogance of his nephew and heir Giannettino Doria, had made him many enemies, and in 1547 the Fieschi conspiracy to dislodge his family from power took place. Giannettino was killed, but the conspirators were defeated, and Doria showed great vindictiveness in punishing them, seizing many of their fiefs for himself. He was also implicated in the murder of Pier Luigi Farnese, duke of Parma and Piacenza, who had helped Fieschi.

Other conspiracies followed, of which the most important was that of Giulio Cybo (1548), but all failed. Although Doria was ambitious and harsh, he was a patriot and successfully opposed Emperor Charles's repeated attempts to have a citadel built in Genoa and garrisoned by Spaniards; neither blandishments nor threats could win him over to the scheme.

Nor did age lessen his energy, for in 1550, aged 84, he again put to sea to confront the Barbary pirates, but with no great success. In 1552 the Ottoman fleet under the command of Turgut Reis defeated the Spanish-Italian fleet of Charles V under the command of Andrea Doria in the Battle of Ponza (1552). War between France and the Empire having broken out once more, the French seized Corsica in the Invasion of Corsica (1553), then administered by the Genoese Bank of Saint George. Doria was again summoned, and he spent two years (1553–1555) on the island fighting the French with varying fortune.

He returned to Genoa for good in 1555, and being very old and infirm, he gave over the command of the galleys to his great-nephew Giovanni Andrea Doria, the son of Giannettino Doria, who conducted an expedition against Tripoli, but proved even more unsuccessful than his great-uncle had been at Algiers, barely escaping with his life after losing the Battle of Djerba against the Turkish fleet of Piyale Pasha and Turgut Reis. Andrea Doria left his estates to Giovanni Andrea. The family of Doria-Pamphili-Landi is descended from Giovanni Andrea Doria and bears his title of Prince of Melfi.

Ships
Several ships were named in honour of the Admiral:

 Two United States Navy ships named  (1775 and 1908).
 The Italian ironclad , completed in 1891, which served in the late 19th and early 20th century, was decommissioned in 1911, and served as the floating battery GR104 during World War I before being scrapped in 1929.
 The Italian battleship , completed in 1916, which served in both World War I and World War II and was decommissioned in 1956.
 The Italian passenger liner , which was launched in 1951, had her maiden voyage in 1953 and sank following a collision in 1956.
 The Italian missile cruiser , built in 1964 and decommissioned in 1991.
 The Italian  , commissioned in 2007.

Paintings and commemorations
A painted sheepskin for The Magnificent and Excellent Andrea Doria hangs at The Breakers in Newport, Rhode Island, US.

References

External links

Italian Renaissance people
1466 births
1560 deaths
Andrea
Genoese admirals
Knights of the Golden Fleece
People from Imperia
People of the Ottoman–Venetian Wars
15th-century condottieri
Medieval Knights of the Holy Sepulchre
Military personnel of the Holy Roman Empire
16th-century condottieri